Roger Allen Aindow (born 23 October 1946) is an English former professional footballer who played as a defender.

Football career
As a youth with Litherland Schoolboys, Aindow primarily played in goal but was converted to defense when he signed for Blackpool in September 1966. He failed to break into the first team at Blackpool and joined Football League Third Division side Southport in October 1967, initially as an amateur. He turned professional in the summer of 1969 and went on to play 58 times for the Sandgrounders, scoring four goals. After leaving the club at the end of the 1970–71 season, Aindow had a long career in non-League football and had a spell in Wales with Rhyl. He played in the West Lancashire League for Fleetwood Hesketh before retiring in 1985.

Personal life
Aindow was born in the town of Seaforth, Merseyside, and currently lives in Formby, where he worked in the motor trade.

References

1946 births
Living people
English footballers
Association football defenders
Blackpool F.C. players
Southport F.C. players
Great Harwood F.C. players
Runcorn F.C. Halton players
Skelmersdale United F.C. players
South Liverpool F.C. players
Rhyl F.C. players
Prescot Cables F.C. players
English Football League players
Formby F.C. players
Ellesmere Port Town F.C. players